Melissa Scott is a science fiction and fantasy author.

Melissa Scott may also refer to:

Melissa Scott, pastor, widow and successor of pastor Gene Scott
Melissa Scott, character in Exiles (Malibu Comics)

See also
 Melissa Scott-Hayward, cricketer
 Melissa Scott-Miller, artist